The Midnight Ride was the alert to the American colonial militia in April 1775 to the approach of British forces before the battles of Lexington and Concord.

The ride occurred on the night of April 18, 1775, immediately before the first engagements of the American Revolutionary War. In the preceding weeks, British Army activity indicated a planned crackdown on the Massachusetts Provincial Congress, then based in Concord. Paul Revere and William Dawes prepared the alert, which began when Robert Newman, sexton of Boston's North Church, used a lantern signal to alert colonists in Charlestown to the Army's advance by way of the Charles River. Revere and Dawes then rode to meet John Hancock and Samuel Adams in Lexington, ten miles distant, alerting up to 40 other riders along the way. Revere and Dawes then headed towards Concord with Samuel Prescott. The three were captured by British troops in Lincoln. Prescott and Dawes escaped but Revere was returned to Lexington and freed after questioning. By giving the Colonists advance warning of the British Army's actions, the ride played a crucial role in the Colonists' victory in the subsequent battles.

The ride has been commemorated in a range of cultural depictions, most notably Henry Wadsworth Longfellow's 1861 poem, "Paul Revere's Ride", which has shaped popular memory of the event.

Background
When British Army activity on April 7, 1775, suggested the possibility of troop movements, Joseph Warren sent Revere to warn the Massachusetts Provincial Congress, then sitting in Concord, the site of one of the larger caches of Patriot military supplies. After receiving the warning, Concord residents began moving the military supplies away from the town.

One week later, on April 14, General Gage received instructions from Secretary of State William Legge, Earl of Dartmouth (dispatched on January 27), to disarm the rebels, who were known to have hidden weapons in Concord, among other locations, and to imprison the rebellion's leaders, especially Samuel Adams and John Hancock. Dartmouth gave Gage considerable discretion in his commands. Gage issued orders to Lieutenant Colonel Francis Smith to proceed from Boston "with utmost expedition and secrecy to Concord, where you will seize and destroy... all Military stores.... But you will take care that the soldiers do not plunder the inhabitants or hurt private property." Gage did not issue written orders for the arrest of rebel leaders, as he feared doing so might spark an uprising.

Between 9 and 10 p.m. on the night of April 18, 1775, Joseph Warren told Revere and William Dawes that the king's troops were about to embark in boats from Boston bound for Cambridge and the road to Lexington and Concord. Warren's intelligence suggested that the most likely objectives of the regulars' movements later that night would be the capture of Adams and Hancock. They did not worry about the possibility of regulars marching to Concord, since the supplies at Concord were safe, but they did think their leaders in Lexington were unaware of the potential danger that night. Paul Revere and William Dawes were sent out to warn them and to alert colonial militias in nearby towns.

Events

Preparation
In the days before April 18, Revere had instructed Robert Newman, the sexton of the North Church, to send a signal by lantern to alert colonists in Charlestown as to the movements of British troops when the information became known. In what is well known today by the phrase "one if by land, two if by sea", one lantern in the steeple would signal the British army's choice of the land route while two lanterns would signal the route "by water" across the Charles River. (In the event, the British chose the water route, and therefore two lanterns were placed in the steeple.) Revere first gave instructions to send the signal to Charlestown. He then crossed the Charles River by rowboat, slipping past the British warship HMS Somerset at anchor. Crossings were banned at that hour, but Revere safely landed in Charlestown and rode to Lexington, avoiding a British patrol and later warning almost every house along the route. The Charlestown colonists dispatched additional riders to the north.

Ride

Riding through present-day Somerville, Medford, and Arlington, Revere warned patriots along his route, many of whom set out on horseback to deliver warnings of their own. By the end of the night there were probably as many as 40 riders throughout Middlesex County carrying the news of the army's advance. Revere did not shout the phrase later attributed to him ("The British are coming!"): his mission depended on secrecy, the countryside was filled with British army patrols, and most of the Massachusetts colonists (who were predominantly English in ethnic origin) still considered themselves British. Revere's warning, according to eyewitness accounts of the ride and Revere's own descriptions, was "The Regulars are coming out." According to his own account, Revere narrowly escaped capture in present-day Somerville near the displayed corpse of a local slave, a local landmark.  Revere continued on and arrived in Lexington around midnight, with Dawes arriving about a half-hour later. They met with Samuel Adams and John Hancock, who were spending the night with Hancock's relatives (in what is now called the Hancock–Clarke House), and they spent a great deal of time discussing plans of action upon receiving the news. They believed that the forces leaving the city were too large for the sole task of arresting two men and that Concord was the main target. The Lexington men dispatched riders to the surrounding towns, and Revere and Dawes continued along the road to Concord accompanied by Samuel Prescott, a doctor who happened to be in Lexington "returning from a lady friend's house at the awkward hour of 1 a.m."

The ride of the three men triggered a flexible system of "alarm and muster" that had been carefully developed months before, in reaction to the colonists' impotent response to the Powder Alarm of September 1774. This system was an improved version of an old network of widespread notification and fast deployment of local militia forces in times of emergency. The colonists had periodically used this system all the way back to the early years of Indian wars in the colony, before it fell into disuse in the French and Indian War. For rapid communication from town to town—in addition to other express riders delivering messages—bells, drums, alarm guns, bonfires, and a trumpet were used, notifying the rebels in dozens of eastern Massachusetts villages that they should muster their militias because the regulars in numbers greater than 500 were leaving Boston with possible hostile intentions. This system was so effective that people in towns  from Boston were aware of the army's movements while it was still unloading boats in Cambridge. Unlike in the Powder Alarm, the alarm raised by the three riders successfully allowed the militia to confront the British troops in Concord, and then harry them all the way back to Boston.

Revere, Dawes, and Prescott were detained by a British Army patrol in Lincoln at a roadblock on the way to Concord. Prescott jumped his horse over a wall and escaped into the woods; he eventually reached Concord. Dawes also escaped, though he fell off his horse not long after and did not complete the ride.

Revere was captured and questioned by the British soldiers at gunpoint. He told them of the army's movement from Boston, and that British army troops would be in some danger if they approached Lexington, because of a large number of hostile militia gathered there. He and other captives taken by the patrol were still escorted east toward Lexington, until about a half-mile from Lexington they heard a gunshot. The British major demanded Revere explain the gunfire, and Revere replied it was a signal to "alarm the country". As the group drew closer to Lexington, the town bell began to clang rapidly, upon which one of the captives proclaimed to the British soldiers: "The bell's ringing! The town's alarmed, and you're all dead men!" The British soldiers gathered and decided not to press further towards Lexington but instead to free the prisoners and head back to warn their commanders. The British confiscated Revere's horse and rode off to warn the approaching army column. Revere walked to Rev. Jonas Clarke's house, where Hancock and Adams were staying. As the battle on Lexington Green unfolded, Revere assisted Hancock and his family in their escape from Lexington, helping to carry a trunk of Hancock's papers.

Legacy

Longfellow's poem

Henry Wadsworth Longfellow popularized Paul Revere in "Paul Revere's Ride", a poem first published in 1861, over 40 years after Revere's death, and reprinted in 1863 as part of Tales of a Wayside Inn. The poem opens:

Longfellow's poem is not historically accurate, but the inaccuracies were deliberate. Longfellow had researched the historical event, using such works as George Bancroft's History of the United States, but he changed the facts for poetic effect. The poem was one of a series in which he sought to create American legends; earlier examples include The Song of Hiawatha (1855) and The Courtship of Miles Standish (1858). Longfellow was successful in creating a legend: Revere's stature rose significantly in the years following the poem's publication.

Parts of the ride route in Massachusetts are now posted with signs marked "Revere's Ride". The route follows Main Street in Charlestown, Broadway and Main Street in Somerville, Main Street and High Street in Medford, Medford Street to Arlington center, and Massachusetts Avenue the rest of the way through Lexington and into Lincoln. Revere's ride is reenacted annually.

Contrary to popular belief, Revere and Dawes were not the only riders; however, they were the only two to be noted in poetry. Samuel Prescott and Israel Bissell were also tasked to undertake the mission, Bissell being the person to ride the farthest distance of all.

Music
The rock group Paul Revere and the Raiders had considerable popularity from the mid-1960s through the early-1970s. The band's namesake and the organist was born Paul Revere Dick, named after Revere. The song "Me and Paul Revere", written by musician Steve Martin and performed with his bluegrass group Steve Martin and the Steep Canyon Rangers, was inspired by the tale of Paul Revere's ride and told from the point of view of Revere's horse, Brown Beauty.

References

Bibliography
 
 
  This work is extensively footnoted, and contains a voluminous list of primary resources concerning all aspects of the Revere's ride and the battles at Lexington and Concord.
 
 
 
 
 
 

Paul Revere